Bhavanisagar block is a revenue block in the Erode district of Tamil Nadu, India. It has a total of 15 panchayat villages; the main town is Bhavanisagar.

Economy
An important agricultural area, there is an Agricultural Research Station in Bhavanisagar and the block contains the Bhavanisagar Dam and Reservoir along the Bhavani River, built between 1948 and 1955. A seminar on Applied Nutrition Programme was held at Bhavanisagar in 1969, and agricultural machinery was upgraded in 1970-1. In recent years, Bhavanisagar block has become a notable area of floriculture, with an increasing number of farmers turning to flower cultivation, with an increasing 10-15% of acreage dedicated to it annually according to 2010 reports. Of particular note is marigold cultivation which can earn Rs. 6 to Rs. 10 per kg during the season and are usually purchased by the traders in Sathyamangalam and Coimbatore to companies producing poultry feed and food colouring.

References 

Revenue blocks of Erode district